"A Girl Like You" is a song written by Jerry Lordan and recorded by Cliff Richard and the Shadows in June 1961. It peaked at number 3 on the UK Singles Chart.

Track listing
 "A Girl Like You" – 2:31
 "Now's the Time to Fall in Love" – 2:08

Personnel
 Cliff Richard – vocals
 Hank Marvin – lead guitar
 Bruce Welch – rhythm guitar
 Jet Harris – bass guitar
 Tony Meehan – drums

Charts

References

1961 songs
1961 singles
Cliff Richard songs
Dutch Top 40 number-one singles
Songs written by Jerry Lordan
Song recordings produced by Norrie Paramor
Columbia Graphophone Company singles